George Wheeler may refer to:

George Wheeler (explorer) (1842–1905), explorer and cartographer, leader of the Wheeler Survey
George Wheeler (entomologist) (1858–1947), English entomologist
George Wheeler (footballer) (1910–1995), Welsh footballer
George Wheeler (gymnast) (1914-1990), American Olympic gymnast
George Wheeler (pitcher) (1869–1946), baseball pitcher
George F. Wheeler (1824–1903), American politician and banker in Wisconsin
George Godfrey Massy Wheeler (1873–1915), recipient of the Victoria Cross
George Wheeler (pinch hitter) (1881–1918), baseball player for 1910 Cincinnati Reds
George Huber Wheeler (1881–1957), United States Navy sailor and Medal of Honor recipient
George Campbell Wheeler (1880–1938), recipient of the Victoria Cross
George W. Wheeler (1860–1932), lawyer, judge, and Chief Justice of the Supreme Court of Connecticut
George William Wheeler (1815–1878), British socialist activist
George C. Wheeler (1897–1991), entomologist
George Augustus Wheeler (1837-1923) Maine historian